Kajal (also Romanized as Kejal; also known as Kachal, Kadzhal’, and Kharābeh-ye-Kachal) is a village in Khvoresh Rostam-e Shomali Rural District, Khvoresh Rostam District, Khalkhal County, Ardabil Province, Iran. At the 2006 census, its population was 460, in 127 families.

References 

Towns and villages in Khalkhal County